The Earrings of Madame de… is a 1953 romantic drama film directed by Max Ophüls, adapted from Louise Lévêque de Vilmorin's 1951 novel by Ophüls, Marcel Archard and Annette Wadement. The film is considered a masterpiece of the 1950s French cinema. Andrew Sarris called it "the most perfect film ever made". Ophüls said the story's construction attracted him, stating "there is always the same axis around which the action continually turns like a carousel. A tiny, scarcely visible axis: a pair of earrings".

The film's different titles reflect on the fact that the surname of the Madame in question – the same as that of her husband's – is never heard nor seen onscreen. The few times in the film when it might be revealed, it is eluded by noise or a camera trick.

Plot summary
Louise (Danielle Darrieux) is an aristocratic woman of Belle Époque Paris, married to André (Charles Boyer), both a count and a high-ranking French army general. Louise is a beautiful, but spoiled and superficial woman who has amassed debts due to her lifestyle. She arranges to secretly sell her costly heart-shaped diamond earrings, a wedding present from her husband, to the original jeweler, Mr Rémy (Jean Debucourt). Relations between Louise and André are companionable, but they sleep in separate beds, have no children, and André has a secret mistress, of whom he has recently tired. Louise disguises the disappearance of the earrings by pretending to have lost them at the opera. The search for them eventually reaches the newspapers ("Theft at the Theatre") which in turn prompts Rémy to go to André and "discreetly" offer to sell them back. He accepts cheerfully and, rather than confront his wife, coolly gives the earrings to his mistress, Lola (Lia Di Leo), whom he happens to be seeing off permanently to Constantinople.

At her destination, however, Lola soon sells the earrings herself to settle gambling debts and they are later purchased by an Italian baron, Fabrizio Donati (Vittorio De Sica), who is on his way to a high diplomatic post in Paris. Through a series of encounters, Donati becomes infatuated with Louise, later dancing with her long into the night at a ball. André's long absence "on maneuvers" facilitates the couple's affair. With each passage of time, the baron asks Louise if she has heard from her husband. André's return prompts Louise to stop seeing Donati, but during a hunting excursion where all three are present, she witnesses Donati fall from his horse and faints. She is said to have a "weak heart," but André sees this behavior as an affectation, and the event makes him suspicious.

Louise becomes disconsolate and announces that she will take a long holiday in the Italian Lake region, alarming both her husband and her lover. Donati brings gifts: roses with the very earrings she had sold earlier. What she had cast aside so easily before suddenly has meaning to her. On her own in Italy, Louise tries to forget Donati who regales her with letters, to which she writes responses, all of which she promptly destroys. She meets with him secretly again and confesses that she's able to console herself only through possession of the earrings, which she now identifies with her lover, not her marriage. Upon her return to Paris, Louise resolves to continue with the affair. To explain the reappearance of the earrings, she now creates an elaborate ruse that they had been misplaced in one of her gloves the entire time, making a big show of "finding" them in front of André. He knows she is lying but says nothing.

At yet another formal ball, André takes the earrings from Louise, quietly takes Donati aside, and confronts him about them, revealing their true history. He then gives them to Donati instructing him to sell them back to the jeweler, so that he may buy them back a third time to give yet again to Louise. Before departing, Donati informs Louise he can no longer see her and expresses his pain at learning of her lies. Louise falls into a deep depression. André presents her with the earrings he has bought back and informs her that her unhappiness is her own fault and that she must give the earrings away to his niece who has just given birth. Louise tearfully agrees. The niece is soon forced to sell the earrings yet again to Rémy to pay off her own husband's debts, and Rémy offers to sell them back to André for a fourth time, but he now angrily refuses. Louise goes to the jeweler herself and buys the earrings back with money from sales of her other jewelry and furs. She informs André of what she has done. In his anguish at having lost her love – or perhaps never having had it – André goes to the gentleman's club where he confronts Donati on the pretext of a slight and challenges him to a duel with pistols.

Louise pleads with Donati not to go through with the duel; André has been seen to be an excellent shot and will surely kill him. Donati is pensive, but refuses to withdraw and arrives at the dueling field with his and André's seconds. Meanwhile, Louise goes to the Church of Saint-Étienne-du-Mont to pray fervently at the shrine of St. Geneviève that Donati be spared – the same place where she was seen earlier praying frivolously that the jeweler will be willing to buy back her earrings. She then races with her servant to the duel just as the agents inform the duelists that the "offended party," André, is allowed to fire first. He takes aim at Donati, who stands unflinching. As Louise hastens up the hill toward the duel, a single shot is heard, but no second shot, implying that one duelist may be dead. She slumps against a tree as the servant runs for help.

Ultimately, it is seen that Louise has left a burning candle at the shrine, along with her prized earrings, and a card reading that they are a gift from her.

Cast

 Charles Boyer as Général André de…
 Danielle Darrieux as Comtesse Louise de…
 Vittorio De Sica as Baron Fabrizio Donati
 Jean Debucourt as Monsieur Rémy
 Jean Galland as Monsieur de Bernac
 Mireille Perrey as La Nourrice
 Paul Azaïs as First coachman
 Josselin
 Hubert Noël as Henri de Maleville
 Lia Di Leo as Lola

Production notes
The couple's affair is represented in a montage of ballroom dancing scenes where Louise and the Baron fall in love. With each implied passage of time, the Baron asks Louise if she has heard from her husband. This sequence, with its glittering costumes and furnishings, and swirling camera work, is a celebrated example of Ophüls' technique.

In Ophüls' original treatment for the film, every scene was to be shot through mirrors on walls and other locations. His producers rejected the idea. After his experience of shooting La Ronde, Ophüls was determined to stay on budget and on schedule for this film and made extensive preparations during pre-production. He ended up finishing the film ahead of schedule and under budget. He worked closely with art director Georges Annenkov to create the right atmosphere for the film, and had Annenkov design prop earrings that were appropriate. The prop earrings were on display at the Franco-London-Film production studios for many years.

The film's script became considerably different from de Vilmorin's short novel, and Ophüls stated that "besides the earrings, there's very little of the novel left in the film...[just] the senselessness of that woman's life." Ophüls spoke privately with Danielle Darrieux between takes throughout the shooting and told her to portray the emptiness of her character. At first Ophüls was too embarrassed to give direction to Vittorio De Sica out of respect for De Sica's work as a director, but the two became friends during the film's production. Darrieux, Charles Boyer and Annenkov had all worked together in 1936 on the film Mayerling, which was Darrieux's first leading role.

Reception
The film received mixed reviews when first released, but its reputation has grown over the years. In a 1961 article in Kulchur and later reprinted in her first book, Pauline Kael praised the movie's performances and its “sensuous camerawork,” “extraordinary romantic atmosphere,” and “polished, epigrammatic dialogue.” The film was revived in England in 1979, where it was rediscovered as a masterpiece. Derek Malcolm called it "a supreme piece of film-making which hardly puts a foot wrong for 2 hours...a magnificent and utterly timeless dissection of passion and affection, the game of life and love itself." Lindsay Anderson criticized the film, stating "the camera is never still; every shot has the tension of a conjuring trick. The sleight of hand is dazzling, but fatally distracting...With a supple, ingenious, glittering flow of images that is aesthetically the diametric opposite of Mme. de Vilmorin's chaste prose, he has made the film an excuse for a succession of rich, decorative displays...In all this visual frou-frou it is not surprising that the characters become lost and the interior development of the drama is almost completely unobserved." François Truffaut wrote that the film was very similar to Ophüls' earlier film Liebelei, stating that "the last half hour, the duel and the finale, is a remake pure and simple." Jacques Rivette praised the film, calling it "a difficult work, in the fullest sense of the word, even in its writing, one in which everything aims to disconcert, distract the viewer from what is essential through the accumulation of secondary actions, wrong turns, repetitions and delays; a work in which the picturesque tries hard to conceal the pathetic."

Molly Haskell has called the film a masterpiece with a cult following that grows every year. Haskell has asserted that the film is usually not as revered as other, more male-oriented films because it is a female-oriented film. Richard Roud has stated that Ophüls made film about "women. More specifically, women in love. Most often, women who are unhappily in love, or whom love brings misfortune of one kind or another."

The Earrings of Madame De... holds an approval rating of 97% on Rotten Tomatoes, based on 34 reviews, with an average rating of 8.73/10. The site's critical consensus reads, "Ophüls' graceful camerawork and visual portrayal of luxury and loss make Earrings a powerful French drama."

Awards
In 1954, Georges Annenkov and Rosine Delamare were nominated for an Academy Award for Best Costume Design, Black-and-White.

References

Bibliography

External links 
 "Max Ophuls's Movie of Matchless Elegance" David Mermelstein, The Wall Street Journal, 7 August 2010
 
 
 The Earrings of Madame de... at TCM 
 
 The Earrings of Madame de... review at DVDbeaver.com
 
The Earrings of Madame de . . . : The Cost of Living an essay by Molly Haskell at the Criterion Collection

1953 films
French black-and-white films
1953 romantic drama films
Films directed by Max Ophüls
Films based on French novels
Adultery in films
Films set in the 1890s
Italian romantic drama films
French romantic drama films
1950s French-language films
Belle Époque
1950s Italian films
1950s French films